Kropol Vitsu (born 1964) is an Indian politician from Nagaland. He was elected to the Nagaland Legislative Assembly from Southern Angami II Assembly constituency in 2018 as a candidate of the Naga People's Front during which he served as Parliamentary Secretary for Home Guards & Civil Defence under the T. R. Zeliang regime and in 2023 as a candidate of the Bharatiya Janata Party.

References

Nagaland politicians
University of Madras alumni
1964 births
Living people
People from Viswema
Naga People's Front politicians
Bharatiya Janata Party politicians from Nagaland